Jessica Ainscough (July 1985 – 26 February 2015) was an Australian teen magazine editor who became a writer and wellness entrepreneur following a rare cancer diagnosis at the age of 22. Ainscough went by the self-coined nickname "The Wellness Warrior" and used her popular blog by the same name to share her personal story of using alternative cancer treatments. Ainscough died of her untreated cancer at the age of 29.

Background
Jessica Ainscough was born in Australia in the South East Queensland city of Ipswich. Ainscough attended the University of the Sunshine Coast, graduating in 2005 with a Bachelor of Communications and majoring in Journalism. During her last year at university, Ainscough gained work experience at the Sydney office of 9 to 5 Magazine where she had her first job after graduating. At the time of her diagnosis, Ainscough was working as an online editor for teen magazine Dolly.

Ainscough and her partner Tallon Pamenter were engaged in July 2014 and had planned to marry in September 2015.

Cancer

Diagnosis
Ainscough was diagnosed with epithelioid sarcoma on April 24, 2008 following a biopsy of lumps removed from her left arm and hand. From the initial diagnosis, Ainscough recalls being informed that epithelioid sarcoma was an extremely rare cancer and difficult to treat. The incidence of epithelioid sarcoma was reported as 0.4 cases per million in 2005. It is twice as likely to occur in men, and three quarters of those diagnosed are between the age of 10 and 39 years. Although epithelioid sarcoma is less common in women, the prognosis has been reported to be more favourable. Surgical oncologist David Gorski has written that without treatment most succumb to the disease within 10 years, however with surgical resection the 10-year survival rate is estimated to be 49-72%, with higher survival rates reported in younger patients such as Ainscough.

Initial treatment
Initially, the only treatment offered to Ainscough was an amputation of the affected arm at the shoulder, known as a forequarter amputation. Ainscough reluctantly agreed. However, shortly before the scheduled surgery her medical team offered an alternative treatment which was to have an isolated limb perfusion. Ainscough consented to chemotherapy and had the procedure in June 2008. The initial scans following chemotherapy showed that the cancer was in remission, but by November the following year the cancer had returned, and the only treatment option was a forequarter amputation. Ainscough refused to have the amputation, and instead turned to alternative cancer treatments.

Alternative cancer treatment
Following her second cancer diagnosis, Ainscough began using Gerson Therapy, an ineffective alternative cancer treatment. Her condition was monitored by her "Gerson doctor" in Mexico who would receive Ainscough's blood tests, along with results from live blood analysis and iridology, two ineffective alternative diagnostic techniques, and conduct analysis using a machine called an "Indigo", which was claimed to be a quantum biofeedback device.

Influencers and supporters
At "Wellness Warrior Events", Ainscough was joined by other celebrity wellness entrepreneurs who would also share their alternative health journeys, including former actor Melissa Ambrosini, musician Wes Carr and celebrity chef Pete Evans. Ainscough invited Cyndi O'Meara, nutritionist and fellow Sunshine Coast wellness entrepreneur, to write the foreword of her book, and later acknowledged O'Meara as the person she admired most professionally. Ainscough also spoke and wrote extensively about the influence of her mother Sharyn Ainscough and alternative cancer treatment advocate Ian Gawler. Her funeral was attended by Belle Gibson, who falsely claimed to have cured her own cancer through alternative therapies.

Ainscough claimed that Ian Gawler's book, You can Conquer Cancer, was a major influence on her when she was initially diagnosed with cancer.  Immediately before going to the Gerson clinic in Mexico in 2010, Ainscough and her partner Tallon Pamenter stayed at The Gawler Foundation. Afterwards, Ainscough wrote: "Last month I spent 10 days at the Gawler Foundation in Melbourne learning all about how to heal myself. It was the most beneficial 10 days of my life". Gawler Foundation founder Ian Gawler is a former veterinarian who survived cancer after surgical treatment, radiotherapy, and chemotherapy. Gawler claims to have overcome a secondary diagnosis of terminal metastatic cancer with a combination of Gerson Therapy and meditation. However, there was no biopsy taken to confirm the secondary cancer diagnosis, and experts have since attributed Gawler's symptoms to advanced tuberculosis—which he also received medical treatment for at the time—rather than secondary bone cancer.

Sharyn Ainscough
In April 2011, Jessica's mother, Sharyn Ainscough, was diagnosed with breast cancer. Sharyn also refused all conventional treatment instead opting to join her daughter in Gerson Therapy. Sharyn Ainscough died in October 2013, two and half years after diagnosis, in line with expectations for untreated breast cancer. At the time of her death, it was widely reported that "Sharyn, followed her daughter in advocating Gerson therapy after being diagnosed with breast cancer".

Death
In December 2014, Ainscough wrote in her blog that she had returned to conventional medical care to treat a large fungating tumour under her left shoulder that had been bleeding non-stop for ten months, leaving her weak and uncomfortable. Under the care of an oncologist, Ainscough received six weeks of radiation therapy in the final weeks of her life.

Responding to Ainscough's death John Dwyer of Friends of Science in Medicine warned of the risk of bowel perforation associated with coffee enemas and said: "There is no credible scientific evidence for any of these alternative treatments that claim to cure cancer," adding that "it can be difficult for people to tell what claims are unscientific and what are not". Whether Ainscough ever directly claimed to have cured her cancer is difficult to ascertain, as her blog "The Wellness Warrior", with 1.5 million followers, has been deleted. However, examples of Ainscough alluding to Gerson Therapy successfully treating her cancer can be found. In an article titled "I'm healing myself from cancer naturally" written by Ainscough for the teen magazine she once edited, Ainscough wrote: "I am ecstatic to report that it has worked for me. I have had no cancer spread, no more lumps pop up (they were popping up rapidly before) and I can actually see some of my tumors coming out through my skin and disappearing'" It was reported that Ainscough earned a "six figures" income from the "Wellness Warrior" brand.

Publication
Make Peace With Your Plate, published 25 September 2013, by Hay House Inc.

See also
 Belle Gibson

References

1985 births
2015 deaths
Australian health activists
Alternative cancer treatment advocates
Alternative medicine activists
Deaths from cancer in Queensland
People in alternative medicine
People from Ipswich, Queensland
Pseudoscientific diet advocates
University of the Sunshine Coast alumni